

Ion Popa (born 1889, date of death unknown) was a Bessarabian politician.

Biography 

He served as Member of the Moldovan Parliament (1917–1918).

Bibliography 
 Alexandru Chiriac. Membrii Sfatului Ţării. 1917–1918. Dicţionar, Editura Fundaţiei Culturale Române, București, 2001.
Gheorghe E. Cojocaru, Sfatul Țării: itinerar, Civitas, Chişinău, 1998, 
Mihai Taşcă, Sfatul Țării şi actualele autorităţi locale, "Timpul de dimineaţă", no. 114 (849), June 27, 2008 (page 16)

External links 
 Biblio Polis – Vol. 25 (2008) Nr. 1 (Serie nouă)
 Arhiva pentru Sfatul Tarii
 Deputaţii Sfatului Ţării şi Lavrenti Beria

Notes

Moldovan MPs 1917–1918
1889 births
Year of death missing